Jacobsonia is a genus of mites in the family Laelapidae.

Species
 Jacobsonia africanus Fain, 1994
 Jacobsonia andrei Fain, 1994
 Jacobsonia berlesei Casanueva & Johnston, 1992
 Jacobsonia puylaerti Fain, 1994
 Jacobsonia submollis (Berlese, 1910)
 Jacobsonia tertia Vitzthum, 1931

References

Laelapidae